Changsha–Zhuzhou–Xiangtan intercity railway or Changzhutan intercity railway, is a higher-speed regional railway in Hunan, China. It connects the provincial capital Changsha with Zhuzhou and Xiangtan. The line was opened to traffic on December 26, 2016. A northwestern extension to Changsha West railway station opened on December 26, 2017. The line uses China Railways CRH6F regional rail trains.

Overview
Changsha–Zhuzhou–Xiangtan intercity railway is envisioned to promote regional economic integration of the Changsha–Zhuzhou–Xiangtan area. Originally proposed a regional rapid transit system, it was redesigned to be built to mainline high-speed railway standards. CR Guangzhou Group, the Hunan Development and Investment Group, the Ministry of Railways and the Hunan provincial government jointly established the "Hunan Intercity Railway Co", which is responsible for the construction and operation of this project. It will be funded with a total investment of 23.3 billion yuan. Initially trains only had an average occupancy rate of 25% with citizens complaining about high prices and infrequent service. In 2017, along with the northwestern extension the railway's operations dramatically changed, frequencies were increased and distinct local/express services were established.

The railway was extended further north from Changsha West to connect to the Shimen–Changsha railway. The extension opened in 2020.

Stations
This intercity railway travels across Changsha, Zhuzhou and Xiangtan. It is built hoping to improve regional public transport and integrate with each city's local transport with transfers to local bus services and the Changsha Metro network. A total of 21 stations will be built across the board, including 12 in Changsha, Zhuzhou with five and four in Xiangtan.

References

High-speed railway lines in China
Rail transport in Hunan
Railway lines opened in 2016